Baron Hoo may refer to

 Baron Hoo, a subsidiary Jacobite title of the Earl of Jersey
 Thomas Hoo, Baron Hoo and Hastings (ca. 1396-1455)
 Hugh Bardulf, Baron of Hoo (ca. 1139-ca. 1203)